Irene Bentley (c. 1870 – June 3, 1940) was an American stage actress and vocalist.

Biography
Bentley was born circa 1870 in Baltimore, Maryland. She appeared in Sally in Our Alley with Marie Cahill and also in The Belle of Bohemia, The Belle of New York, It Happened in Nordland, and  The Belle of Mayfair. In 1906, she married librettist Harry B. Smith. This was her second marriage. She died at Allenhurst, New Jersey, on June 3, 1940, aged 69 or 70.

Niece
A niece of her second husband, Harry B. Smith, used Irene Bentley's name to become a film actress. Hence there are two actresses named Irene Bentley when perusing film or stage biographies. The younger Irene Bentley was born in 1904 and died in 1965, and appeared in films such as My Weakness (1933), Smoky (1933), and Frontier Marshal (1934).

References

External links
Irene Bentley profile, IBDb.com. Accessed November 13, 2022.
Portrait gallery (New York City Public Library, Billy Rose collection)
Irene Bentley gallery (University of Washington, Sayre Collection)
on the cover of THE THEATRE magazine; September 1903 (archived)

1870 births
1940 deaths
American stage actresses
20th-century American actresses
Date of birth unknown
Actresses from Baltimore